(+)-epi-α-Bisabolol synthase (EC  4.2.3.138) is an enzyme with systematic name (2E,6E)-farnesyl-diphosphate diphosphate-lyase (cyclizing, (+)-epi-α-bisabolol-forming). This enzyme catalyses the following chemical reaction

 (2E,6E)-farnesyl diphosphate + H2O  (+)-epi-α-bisabolol + diphosphate

This enzyme is isolated from the plant Phyla dulcis (Aztec sweet herb).

References

External links 
 

EC 4.2.3